The Onekaka River is a river of the Tasman Region of New Zealand's South Island.

See also
List of rivers of New Zealand

References

Rivers of the Tasman District
Kahurangi National Park
Rivers of New Zealand